Xerocomic acid is a red-orange pigment found in fungi of the order Boletales (and is named after the genus Xerocomus). It is the precursor to variegatic acid, and is preceded by atromentic acid and atromentin. As an example, it is isolated from Serpula lacrymans. It is soluble in methanol. An oxidase acting on xerocomic acid is responsible for the "bluing" reaction seen in mushrooms.

Condensation of two units of xerocomic acid form the pigments sclerocitrin, badione A, and also norbadione A, which are found in the mushroom Scleroderma citrinum Pers.

Variants include isoxerocomic acid and O-methylxerocomic acid.

References

Polyphenols
Catechols
Furanones
Carboxylic acids